= Krome photos =

American photo-editing company

Krome Photos is an American privately held photo-editing company that uses artificial intelligence to connect people with professional photo editors. Operated by Eduardo Llach, it was founded in 2010.

== History ==
Krome Photos is an online service that works on iOS, Android, or by browsing the Krome Photo website. Using their smart phones, customers can remove unwanted details in the photo, merging elements of multiple images into one using multiple techniques etc. I

The company also produces "Krome Look Books" that includes backgrounds and styles for photo edits. It also provides travel scenes, backdrops, as well as general outdoor scenes.
